GTL may refer to:

Organisations
 GTL Ltd, an Indian network service provider
 Georgia Tech Lorraine, a campus of the Georgia Institute of Technology in Metz, France
 Glenvale Transport, an English bus company
 Global Tel Link, an American telecommunications company
 Groupe Tactique Lorraine, a French resistance force in World War II
 Guntakal railway division (reporting mark), of Indian Railways
 Guntakal Junction railway station (station code), Andhra Pradesh, India

Science and technology
 Gas to liquids, a refinery process
 Gunning transceiver logic, a type of logic signaling

Other uses
 GT Legends, a video game
 GTL (Grand Touring, Light); in motorsports, a 1980s light prototype (lesser than GTP) class of the IMSA GT Championship

See also

 
 GTI (disambiguation)
 GT1 (disambiguation)